The Shand Group (also known as TSG) is an independent, integrated advertising and marketing agency located in Santa Barbara, California, and operating satellite offices in Los Angeles, New York, San Francisco, Seattle and Austin.  The agency was founded in Los Angeles in 1982 by president Bobby Shand, and operates with ten to thirty employees and contract associates.  Marketing services include: market positioning and strategy, brand identity, advertising and collateral, web development, media planning and placement.  TSG's client base includes products and services aimed at the upscale consumer and trade markets.

Clients, past and present, include: Platinum Guild International, A. Lange & Sohne, IWC, Tag Heuer, Memoire, Argyle Pink Diamonds, GIA, Simon G., Kraiko Diamonds, Mentor Corp., Isolagen, Schwartzkopf & Henkel, Agera, Jill Stuart, Guess, mac&jac, Absolut Vodka, Adidas, and Chrysler.

History 

Moving the senior management office to Santa Barbara in 1995 allowed the principals, Bobby and Susan Shand, to fulfill their commitment to quality of life for their son, Justin Shand, as well as their employees by utilizing technology to establish a then revolutionary virtual office setup that allowed top creative and account personnel to conduct their job functions from across the county.  Satellite offices were established in New York, Los Angeles, San Francisco, and Seattle, with creative talent pulled from all corners of the country.

Awards 

2009 Addy Award Silver, "GIA Retailer Support Kit" (Sales Kit or Product Information Sheets)

2009 Addy Award Silver, GIA "Around the World, Around the Clock" (Consumer or Trade Publication, Spread)

2009 Addy Award Bronze, GIA "No Matter How Closely You Look, You Simply Won't See What We See" (Consumer or Trade Publication, Full Page)

2006 Summit Bronze Award, Puragen Physician Sales Brochure, “Everything is about to change”

2005 Addy Award, District 15 Silver, Ultrasculpt consumer ad, “Naked”

2005 Addy Awards: Gold (Puragen Physician Sales Brochure), Silvers (UltraSculpt trade ad campaign; UltraSculpt consumer ad), Bronzes (Puragen logo; Puragen trade ad spread)

2004 Summit Bronze Award, Mentor 8-page trade brand launch, “Mentormorphosis”

2003 Summit Creative Award Bronze, Platinum Guild International, "Moments" consumer magazine campaign

Summit Creative awards
Addy Awards
Santa Barbara County Tobacco Prevention

References 
  Brandweek
  Brandweek
  Brandweek
  JCK
  National Jeweler
  National Jeweler
  TimeZone
  Summit Awards
  Addy Awards

External links 
 Official site

Advertising agencies of the United States
Companies based in Los Angeles
Santa Barbara, California